The twelfth cycle of Holland's Next Top Model  premiered on 2 September 2019 on RTL5. Anna Nooshin reprised the role the show's host.  The panel of judges was again composed of cycle 2 winner Kim Feenstra and photographer Nigel Barker. JeanPaul Paula did not return, in his place there will be a different guest judge each week.

The winner will be on the cover ELLE Netherlands and win a contract with The Movement model agency

Contestants
(Ages stated are at start of contest)

Episodes

Episode 1
Original airdate: 

This was the first casting episode where the top 20 will be chosen.

Episode 2
Original airdate: 

This was the second casting episode. After a tough model bootcamp and the promo shoot the top 20 was narrowed down to the top 16 who, in 2 groups of 8 moved into two different model houses. 

Eliminated: Mirthe Dijksta, Jippe Lasschuijt, Jordan van der Heijden & Joy Blijd

Episode 3
Original airdate: 

This episode focused on the models in modelhouse 1. The model had their make overs and did this year's promo shoot.

First call-out: Bibi Doesburg
Bottom two: Anouk Borgman & Marnix Baas
Eliminated: Marnix Baas
Featured photographers: Meis Belle Wahr & Jip Merkies
Guest judge: Nikkie Plessen

Episode 4
Original airdate: 

This week it was modelhouse 2's models turn to under go their make overs and to do their promo shoot.

First call-out: Jay Hofstede
Bottom two: Joëlla Ajayi & Sam Hofman
Eliminated: Joëlla Ajayi
Featured photographers: Meis Belle Wahr & Jip Merkies
Guest judge: Loiza Lamers

Episode 5
Original airdate: 

First call-out: Marcus Hansma
Bottom two: Anouk Borgman & Benjamin van Dam
Eliminated: Anouk Borgman
Featured photographer: Nigel Barker
Guest judge: Paultje Column

Episode 6
Original airdate: 

Challenge winner: Nick Bonsink
First call-out: Jay Hofstede
Bottom two: Silke Otten & Sinio Sanchez
Eliminated: Sinio Sanchez
Featured photographer: Cooper Seykens
Guest judge: Jill Kortleve

Episode 7
Original airdate: 

Challenge winner: Bibi Doesburg
First call-out: Marcus Hansma
Bottom two: Samuel Verissimo & Tenisha Ramazan
Eliminated: Samuel Verissimo & Tenisha Ramazan
Featured photographer: TBA
Guest judge: Olaf Hussein

Episode 8
Original airdate: 

First call-out: Maha Eljak
Bottom two: Jay Hofstede & Silke Otten
Eliminated: None
Featured photographer: Kim Feenstra
Guest judge: Famke Louise Meijer

Episode 9
Original airdate: 

Challenge winners: Benjamin van Dam & Silke Otten
Quit: Sam Hofman
First call-out: Marcus Hansma
Bottom two: Bibi Doesburg & Jawahir Khalifa
Eliminated: Jawahir Khalifa
Featured photographer: Richard Monsieurs
Guest judge: Natasja Keizer

Episode 10
Original airdate: 

First call-out: Silke Otten
Bottom two: Bibi Doesburg & Maha Eljak
Eliminated: Maha Eljak
Featured photographer:
Guest judge: Julian Jansen

Episode 11
Original airdate: 

First call-out: Lenny Kruider
Bottom two: Marcus Hansma & Nick Bonsink
Eliminated: Nick Bonsink
Featured photographer: Jeroen W. Mantel
Guest judge: Edine Russel

Episode 12
Original airdate: 

Challenge winner: Silke Otten
First call-out: Jay Hofstede
Bottom two: Bibi Doesburg & Silke Otten
Eliminated: Bibi Doesburg
Featured photographer: Kim Feenstra
Guest judge: None

Episode 13
Original airdate: 

Challenge winner: Benjamin van Dam
First call out: Silke Otten
Bottom two: Benjamin van Dam & Lenny Kruider
Eliminated: Benjamin van Dam
Featured photographer: Nigel Barker
Guest judge: None

Episode 14
Original airdate: 

This was the recap episode. Anna sat down with the Top 10 contestant and talked about their journey throughout the competition.

Episode 15
Original airdate: 

This episode the four finalists were being filmed coming home. Furthermore they had a meet & greet in Veenendaal. The next day they had their last photo shoot.
Featured photographer: Philippe Vogelenzang

Episode 16
Original airdate: 

Final four: Jay Hofstede, Lenny Kruider, Marcus Hansma & Silke Otten
Eliminated: Lenny Kruider
Final three: Jay Hofstede, Marcus Hansma & Silke Otten
Runners-up: Jay Hofstede & Silke Otten
Holland's Next Top Model: Marcus Hansma

Results

 The contestant was eliminated
 The contestant was part of a non-elimination bottom two
 The contestant quit the competition
 The contestant won the competition

Notes

References

Holland's Next Top Model
2019 Dutch television seasons